Stonehill or Stone Hill may refer to:

Places

United States
 Stone Hill, Missouri, an unincorporated community
 Stone Hill (Montana), a climbing area in northwestern Montana
 Stone Hill Historic District, Baltimore, Maryland

Elsewhere
 Stone Hill Rocks, a site of special scientific interest in West Sussex, England

Schools
 Stonehill College, a private Roman Catholic college in Easton, Massachusetts, USA
 Stonehill High School, a former school in Birstall Leicestershire, England, closed in 2015 after opening of The Cedars Academy
 Stonehill International School, Bangalore, India
 Stone Hill Middle School, Loudoun County, Virginia, USA

People with the surname
 Randy Stonehill (born 1952), American singer-songwriter
 Robert Stonehill, fictionalized portrayal of William Canfield in the 2010 film Extraordinary Measures

Other uses
 Stonehill scandal, 1962 bribery scandal in the Philippines
 Stone Hill Winery,  Hermann, Missouri, USA
 Stone Hill Center, part of the Clark Art Institute in Williamstown, Massachusetts, USA